All railway stations in Jamaica closed in October 1992 when passenger traffic abruptly ceased. They are here listed by branch and distance from Kingston. In some cases elevation (height above sea level) is also shown. The Jamaica Railway Corporation resumed operating passenger services in July 2011, before ending them again in August 2012 due to financial difficulties.


Kingston to Montego Bay main line 

There were 22 stations and 17 halts a halt being a flag stop.:

 Kingston railway station (53m) - Terminus and national capital
 Greenwich Town Halt
 Marcus Garvey Drive Halt
 Hunts Bay Halt
 Gregory Park railway station
 Grange Lane station
 Spanish Town railway station - Branch junction
 Horizon Park Halt
 Hartlands Halt
 Bushy Park Halt
 Old Harbour station formerly Whim Station
 May Pen Station - Branch junction
 Jacob's Hut
 Four Paths station
 Rock Halt
 Clarendon Park station
 Scott's Pass Halt
 Porus station
 Williamsfield station
 Grove Place Halt

 Kendal Station - accident September 1, 1957 175 killed and over 800 injured
 Greenvale station
 Comfort Hall Halt
 Duck Pond Halt
 Oxford Halt
 Balaclava railway station (382m) - accident July 30, 1938 32 killed and 70 injured
 Siloah Halt
 Appleton station
 Appleton Tourist Halt
 Maggotty station
 Ipswich station
 Breadnut Walk Halt
 Stonehenge station
 Catadupa station
 Cambridge station
 Montpelier railway station, Jamaica
 Anchovy railway station
 Ailford's Halt
 Gordon's Halt
 Montego Bay railway station (63m) - Terminus and second largest city

Spanish Town to Ewarton branch line 

There were 4 stations and 5 halts:

 Spanish Town railway station (Branch Junction)
 St. John's Road Halt
 Angels Halt
 Crescent Halt
 Bog Walk Station - Junction
 Michleton Halt
 Linstead Station (Branch junction)
 Sterling Castle Halt
 Ewarton Station (Terminus)

Bog Walk to Port Antonio branch line

There were 13 stations and 15 halts:

 Bog Walk Station (Branch Junction)
 Crawle Halt formerly New Works
 Riversdale Station formerly Natural Bridge Station
 Harewood Halt
 Darling Spring Halt
 Troja Station
 Troja Halt
 Richmond Station
 Highgate Station formerly Orange River Station
 Baughs Halt

 Esher Station
 Albany Station formerly Moore Hall Station
 Belfield Halt
 Grays Inn Halt
 Fort George Halt
 Annotto Bay Station
 Fort Stewart Halt
 Windsor Castle Halt
 Buff Bay Station
 Spring Garden Halt

 Orange Bay Station
 Hope Bay Station
 Robertson's Halt
 Saint Margaret's Bay Station
 Snow Hill Halt
 Passley Gardens Halt
 Norwich Halt
Fuschia
 Port Antonio Station (Terminus)

Linstead to New Works branch line

There must have been at least 2 stations on this three mile branch line:
 Linstead Station (Branch Junction)
 New Works Station (Terminus)

May Pen to Frankfield branch line

There were 10 stations and halts on the line c1973. More recent references mention only nine. The line closed in 1974.

 May Pen Station - Branch junction
 Longville Halt
 Suttons Station
 Cross Roads/Ivy Store Station
 Chapelton Station
 Danks Station
 Morgans Station
 Bryan's Hill Station extant 1973, unmentioned 2005.
 Crooked River Station
 Trout Hall Station
 Frankfield railway station (276m) - Terminus

Strays
 Bernard Lodge which is a sugar estate south east of Spanish Town. Satellite images show what appears to be an abandoned line heading in this direction from Spanish Town station but no other references to it have been found.

See also
List of railway tunnels in Jamaica

References

External links

Railway stations
Jam
Railway stations